Drew Alan Mahalic (born May 22, 1953) is a former American football linebacker who played four seasons in the National Football League (NFL) with the San Diego Chargers and Philadelphia Eagles. He was drafted by the Denver Broncos in the third round of the 1975 NFL Draft. He played college football at the University of Notre Dame and attended North Farmington High School in Farmington Hills, Michigan.  He later received his J.D. degree from Harvard Law School.

References

External links
Just Sports Stats

Living people
1953 births
Players of American football from New York (state)
American football linebackers
Notre Dame Fighting Irish football players
San Diego Chargers players
Philadelphia Eagles players
Sportspeople from Albany, New York
Harvard Law School alumni
North Farmington High School alumni